Grace Brooker (born 20 June 1999) is a New Zealand rugby union player. She made her test debut for New Zealand in 2019. She plays for Matatū in the Super Rugby Aupiki competition and represents Canterbury provincially.

Personal life 
Brooker attended Christchurch Girls' High School and then graduated with a Bachelor of Sport Coaching in Physical Education from the University of Canterbury.

Rugby career

2019 
Brooker made her test debut for New Zealand against Australia on 17 August at Auckland. She scored two tries for the NZ Development XV at the Oceania Rugby Women's Championship in Fiji.

2021 
In 2021, she was named in the Black Ferns touring squad to England and France. Brooker earned her first start in the second test match against England. She sustained a knee injury in the 24th minute and was replaced by Patricia Maliepo. She was ruled out of the tour after undergoing knee surgery.

Brooker signed with Matatū for the inaugural season of Super Rugby Aupiki for 2022. However, her ongoing knee injury forced her to miss the competitions debut.

2022 
Despite missing out on selection for the Black Ferns for their World Cup defence on home soil, Brooker assisted the Black Ferns with video analysis during the tournament.

References

External links 

 Black Ferns Profile

1999 births
Living people
New Zealand female rugby union players
New Zealand women's international rugby union players